The Bethune–Cookman Wildcats baseball team is a varsity intercollegiate athletic team of Bethune–Cookman University in Daytona Beach, Florida, United States. The team is a member of the Southwestern Athletic Conference, which is part of the National Collegiate Athletic Association's Division I. The team plays its home games at Radiology Associates Field at Jackie Robinson Ballpark in Daytona Beach, Florida. Jonathan Hernandez is the team's head coach starting in the 2019 season.

History
Mervyl Melendez was named the head coach at Bethune-Cookman, leading his alma mater to eleven Mid-Eastern Athletic Conference championships in his twelve seasons. As coach at Bethune-Cookman, Melendez led the team two back-to-back undefeated conference seasons in 2010 and 2011. His teams also won the Mid-Eastern Athletic Conference baseball tournament every year from 2000 through 2011, with the exception of 2005. He won 379 games as coach of the Wildcats, and in 2009 became the second-youngest coach in NCAA history to win 300 games. Prior to the start of the 2012 season, Jason Beverlin was named the head coach at Bethune-Cookman. On August 14, 2018, Jonathan Hernandez was named the head coach of the Bethune–Cookman Wildcats baseball program. Following a 17–38 season in 2019, Hernandez was able to land the 59th ranked recruiting class.

Head coaches

See also
List of NCAA Division I baseball programs

References

External links